The Danville Register & Bee is a daily newspaper serving Danville, Virginia, United States, published seven days a week. It is owned by Lee Enterprises.

History
The paper was previously published as The Danville Register and The Bee. The two were merged on July 1, 1989. The Register was founded as The Daily Register, in February 1882. The Bee was founded as the Danville Daily Bee, in 1899.

References

External links 
 
 

1882 establishments in Virginia
Daily newspapers published in Virginia
Danville, Virginia
Lee Enterprises publications
Publications established in 1882